Outrage is a 1973 made-for-television film that aired on the American Broadcasting Company's  (ABC) popular Movie of the Week franchise. The movie, which originally aired on November 28, 1973, tells the story of a suburban neighborhood and family that is repeatedly terrorized by a group of privileged young men from neighboring families. The film is set in an idealized rural suburban community.

The film stars Robert Culp, Marlyn Mason and Beah Richards, and featured Nicholas Hammond, James Sikking, Thomas Leopold, and Mark Lenard. The film was directed Richard T. Heffron, and written by writer William Wood.

The film was originally titled One Angry Man. Turner Classic Movies lists the title of the film as "Outrage!" with the addition of the exclamation point. The movie would later inspire a 1998 TV film remake of the same name with Rob Lowe and Jennifer Grey.

Plot summary

Jim Kiler, a suburbanite, finds himself and his family at the mercy of a group of young men from neighboring families who have singled out the Kilers after running roughshod over the greater community. While Kiler attempts at first to reason with the youths, their response is to step up the attacks on the family, which grow more emboldened and dangerous as the film continues. Kiler and his wife eventually feel that in addition to their personal safety, the youths are also trying to tempt their young daughter into situations that would harm her.

Kiler tries to talk to the parents of the young men. However, the parents of the youths either refuse to believe that their sons are capable of their actions, or blame Kiler for aggravating the situation. The parents of the youths are also self-absorbed in their own issues and resent Kiler's suggestions that they are at fault for their sons inability to tell right from wrong. Local law enforcement officials are unable and/or unwilling to become involved. Kiler and his family find themselves surrounded by people refusing to take action, or in denial that Kiler's claims are as dire as he says.

As the family finds itself reaching a point where a resolution has been found, the youths launch an attack on the family, which injures a member of the household. This action finally prompts the rational, logical Kiler to abandon his peaceful approach and take matters into his own hands as his outrage reaches the breaking point.

The film leaves the viewer with some satisfaction that he is able to avenge his family's torment by attacking the youths.   At the end of the film, it notes, as it did in real life, that no charges were pressed on Kiler, and there were no more issues with the youths.

External links

References 

1973 television films
1973 films
1973 crime drama films
1970s crime thriller films
1970s thriller drama films
ABC Movie of the Week
American crime drama films
American crime thriller films
American thriller drama films
Films about families
Films scored by Jimmie Haskell
Films set in California
American drama television films
Films directed by Richard T. Heffron
1970s American films